, codenamed "Project K", is a video game developed by Sega along with syn Sophia and released by Sega for the PlayStation Portable (PSP) in 2010. The game was introduced on April 21, 2010 by Famitsu and is a spin-off of Sega's Yakuza series. An adaptation of the game was televised from October 5 to December 21, 2010, on Tokyo Broadcasting System.

Plot 
Tatsuya Ukyo is an aimless youth on the streets of Kamurocho who is framed for an assault that left a young boy comatose.

Gameplay
The gameplay is focused on 1-on-1 brawling and martial arts, rather than the beat-em-up gameplay of the main Yakuza series. The combat is modeled after Def Jam Fight for NY, made by AKI Corporation (now syn Sophia), combined with elements of the main series' titles such as heat actions, overworld enemy encounters, and picking up weapons scattered around the arena. The 3D rendered gameplay uses the same kind of fixed camera system as in the first two Yakuza games on the PlayStation 2.

Content
Though on PSP, the game has similar mini-games to the main series, such as bowling, claw machines, and a batting center. Hostess clubs feature an interaction for a Kiss, which depends on how highly hearted the hostess is. Part-time jobs have been added for gaining money, as it is purposefully scarce in the game compared to other franchise titles.

Communication mode

As part of the game's multiplayer mode, a custom character is required to play online. This mode consists of missions to unlock items for character customization, and can be played either solo or cooperatively with another player. A standard VS mode can also be played among other players and teams. Fighting styles and stats are carried over from offline mode, and are based on the player's progress in the game.

TV drama
A television series was filmed and broadcast by TBS.

Sequel

A sequel,  was introduced for PSP by Ryū ga Gotoku series creator Toshihiro Nagoshi in Weekly Famitsu and released in Japan on March 22, 2012.

Legacy

Although the game, along with its sequel, is one of the few entries in the Yakuza series which has never received an international release, interest from fans has led to the development of fan translations for both games.

References

External links
Official website 
Official TV drama website

2010 video games
Action-adventure games
Japan-exclusive video games
Organized crime video games
PlayStation Portable games
PlayStation Portable-only games
Sega video games
Single-player video games
Syn Sophia games
Video game sequels
Video games scored by Hideki Naganuma
Video games set in Japan
Yakuza (franchise)
Video games scored by Hidenori Shoji
Video games developed in Japan